The following outline is provided as an overview of and topical guide to the Åland Islands:

Åland – autonomous, demilitarized, monolingually Swedish-speaking administrative province, region and historical province of the Republic of Finland.  The Åland Islands form an archipelago in the Baltic Sea at the entrance to the Gulf of Bothnia.  The Åland Islands are the smallest province of Finland. Due to the Åland Islands' autonomous status, the powers exercised at the provincial level by representatives of the central state administration in the rest of Finland are largely exercised by the Government of the Åland Islands.

General reference

 Pronunciation:
 Common English country names: Åland or the Åland Islands
 Official English country name: The Autonomous State of Åland of the Republic of Finland
 Common endonym(s):  
 Official endonym(s):  
 Adjectival(s): Alandian
 Demonym(s):
 Etymology: Name of Åland
 ISO country codes:  AX, ALA, 248
 ISO region codes:  See ISO 3166-2:AX
 Internet country code top-level domain:  .ax

Geography of Åland 

 Åland is: an archipelago of over 6,500 islands, and an autonomous province of Finland. See also Nordic countries.
 Location:
 Northern Hemisphere and Eastern Hemisphere
 Eurasia
 Europe
 Northern Europe
 Nordic countries
 Baltic Sea
 Population of Åland: 27,210 (2008)
 Area of Åland: 
 Atlas of Åland

Environment of Åland 

 World Heritage Sites in Åland: None

Geographic features of Åland 

 Islands of Åland
 Märket
 Sea of Åland

Regions of Åland 
Fasta Åland — Ninety per cent of the population of Åland live on Fasta Åland (the Main Island), which is also the site of the capital town of Mariehamn.

Administrative divisions of Åland

Municipalities of Åland 

 Capital of Åland: Mariehamn
 List of Åland municipalities by population
 List of Åland municipalities by area

Demography of Åland

Government and politics of Åland 

 Form of government: autonomous parliamentary representative democratic demilitarised and unilingually Swedish territory of Finland
 Capital of Åland: Mariehamn
 Åland as a constituency of Finland
 Åland Representation in the Parliament of Finland
 Åland conventions — establish the demilitarization and neutralization of Åland.
 Elections in Åland
 Political parties in Åland

Branches of the government of Åland

Executive branch of the government of Åland 
 Government of Åland
 There are two executive authorities in Åland:
 Head of state: President of Finland
 Head of government: Lantråd (Premier of Åland)
 Vice lantråd
 Cabinet of Åland
 Åland State Provincial Office
 Ministries of Åland
 Ministry of Finance 
 Ministry of Education and Culture 
 Ministry of Social Affairs and Environment 
 Ministry of Administration and EU-affairs 
 Ministry of Industry and Trade 
 Ministry of Communications and Infrastructure

Legislative branch of the government of Åland 

 Parliament of Åland (unicameral)
 List of speakers of the Parliament of Åland

Judicial branch of the government of Åland 

 Supreme Court of Åland

Foreign relations of Åland 

 Although autonomous, Åland is part of Finland and does not conduct foreign relations.
 Åland as a constituency of Finland
 Åland conventions — establish the demilitarization and neutralization of Åland.
 Relationship of Åland to the European Union — Åland is a Special Member of the EU.

International organization membership 
none

Law and order in Åland 

 Constitution of Åland
 Law enforcement in Åland

Military of Åland 

 Military status of Åland — Åland is both demilitarized and neutralized by international treaty: it may not militarize, be militarized, nor participate in war.
 Åland crisis
 Åland conventions — establish the demilitarization and neutralization of Åland.
 Command
 Commander-in-chief: none
 Ministry of Defence: none
 Conscription in Åland — Citizens of Åland cannot be conscripted into military service.
 Forces: none
 Military bases: none

History of Åland

Culture of Åland 

 Architecture of Åland
 Bomarsund — nineteenth-century fortress in Sund
Built in the 14th century, and held in fief during the Middle Ages by various nobles, feudal chiefs, and kings, it had significant period in the 15th and 16th centuries.
 Art in Åland
 Television in Åland
 Cuisine of Åland
 Gambling in Åland
 Paf — a Finnish company that operates a legal gambling monopoly on the Åland Islands.
 Languages of Åland
 Åland Swedish
 Museums of Åland
 Åland Museum
 Åland Maritime Museum
 Pommern
 National symbols of Åland
 Anthem of Åland: Ålänningens sång
 Coat of arms of Åland
 Flag of Åland
 Public holidays in Åland
 Sport in Åland
 Ålands Fotbollförbund
 Åland Islands national football team
 Ålandscupen
 World Heritage Sites in Åland: None

Economy and infrastructure of Åland

 Economic rank, by nominal GDP (2007):
 Banking in Åland
 Banks in Åland
 Communications in Åland
 Internet in Åland
 Newspapers of Åland
 Ålandstidningen
 Nya Åland
 Posten Åland — postal service.
Currency of Åland: Euro (see also: Euro topics)
ISO 4217: EUR
 Tourism in Åland
 Transport on the Åland Islands
 Airports in Åland
 Ports of Åland
 Långnäs

See also 

 edition of Wikipedia, the free encyclopedia

Index of Åland-related articles
List of Åland-related topics
List of international rankings
Outline of Europe
Outline of Finland
Outline of geography

References

External links

Åland - Official Site (mainly in Swedish)
Åland in Brief
Government of Åland (in Swedish)
Parliament of Åland
Act on the Autonomy of Åland
B7 Baltic Islands Network
The example of Åland:autonomy as a minority protector, thisisFINLAND.fi
Buy liquor, but not a house, thisisFINLAND.fi
Åland Official Tourist Gateway
Ålandsbanken
Posten Åland - the Post Office of Åland
Ålandstidningen - Local Newspaper

Aland Islands, the
Aland Islands, the
Outline